William Richard King, the thirty-sixth President of The Institute of Management Sciences (TIMS), is a retired American university professor who studied and researched management science and information systems at the University of Pittsburgh in Pennsylvania. He was the Founding President of the Association for Information Systems, co-founder of the International Conference on Information Systems, and the founder of the America's Conference on Information Systems. He has an h-index of 77 when including all of the fields in which he has published according to Google Scholar.

Biography 
William R. King was born on December 24, 1938, in Southwestern Pennsylvania to Dewey Clark and Cambria Edith (Jones) King. He grew up in a small town called Elrama in Southwestern Pennsylvania. He described himself as a "township kid" at the time he went to Clairton High School. In high school, he was chosen to speak for his class of 450 at the graduation ceremony. In a memoir which was written in September 2011, he recalled a story that happened in tenth grade and he thought his life changed at Clairton High School.

King received his bachelor's degree (with honors) at Pennsylvania State University in 1960. In college, he was in the Air Force ROTC and was named "Outstanding Cadet" in his junior year and "Distinguished Military Graduate" on graduation. After graduation, he worked as an industrial engineer for Pittsburgh Steel Company. Then he enrolled in graduate school and received his master's degree at Case Institute of Technology in 1962, and Ph.D. in Operations Research at Case Institute of Technology in 1964. Professor Russell L. Ackoff was his advisor. King shaped his professional goals with the help of Professor Russell L. Ackoff and he transferred from a jet pilot to a scholar and consultant.

After getting his Ph.D., King was appointed Assistant Professor of Operations Research at Case and served from 1964 to 1965, a very unusual thing for a graduate to be so appointed. From 1965 to 1967, he served as a First Lieutenant in the US Air Force. He was an Assistant Professor of Statistics and Operations Research at the Air Force Institute of Technology.

In 1967, King became an Associate Professor at the University of Pittsburgh's Graduate School of Business. In 1968, he was promoted to Full Professor, the youngest person to be so named in the modern history of the University. After arriving at the University of Pittsburgh, King led the redesign of the doctoral program and the creation of a multi-school "MS in Telecommunications" degree, "Techno MBA" and MS-MBA Double Degree programs. These programs grew significantly under his leadership.

King remained at the University of Pittsburgh for 41 years. During this time, he had a number of Visiting (in-residence) assignments at City University of Hong Kong, University of California-Berkeley, Singapore National University, Auckland University, National Sun Yat-Sen University (Taiwan), Travelers Insurance's Research Department, among others. He mentored over 100 Ph.D. graduates. In 2008, he retired as "University Professor", which is the most distinguished academic rank from the University of Pittsburgh.

Dr. King married his beautiful high-school sweetheart, Fay Eileen Bickerton, in 1958. They have 3 children and 10 grandchildren. As retirees, they are "snowbirds" who reside at their beachfront home in Port Charlotte, FL in the Winter and at their Pittsburgh home in Fox Chapel Borough in the Summer.

Recognition 
William R. King received the Marquis Who's Who Lifetime Achievement Award in 2019. In 2004, he received the "AIS LEO Award". LEO Award is an honor to recognize outstanding scholars who have an impact on the field of information systems globally and also have an impact outside the field. In 2002, he was recognized as Institute for Operations Research and the Management Science Fellow (INFORMS Fellow). INFORMS Fellow receipts are expected to be outstanding lifetime achievements in operations research and management sciences and have significant accomplishments in advancing of operations research and management science. In 1999, he was awarded "AIS Fellow Award". AIS Fellow Award is an honor to recognize scholars who have a high degree of professional and personal integrity, and have significant contributions to the field globally. He was awarded Fellow of the Decision Science Institute and a full member of the Association for the Advancement of Science.

Dr. King has a profound impact on the fields of operations research, management science, and information systems. He established AIS (Association for Information Systems) and served as the first president of AIS from 1994 to 1995. His presidency of TIMS (The Institute of Management Sciences) led to the establishment of INFORMS in 1995. He was co-founder of the annual International Conference on Information System. He founded the annual America's Conference on Information Systems.

Research and Professional Activities 
King has authored 325 papers (according to Google Scholar) and 19 books.

King's research interest includes strategic planning, project management, information systems in management, system analysis, knowledge management, knowledge management systems, organizational learning, business planning, and strategic use of information systems. His findings in research have been applied to business and finance. King's method has been applied to develop FICO scores. He also developed a concept that laid out the foundation of strategic information systems. The McKinsey Foundation recognized "Systems Analysis and Project Management", a book he co-authored with David Cleland, as a seminal work to management. "Project Management Handbook", which he co-edited, was recognized as the AIIE's Book-of-Year Award.

King was very active throughout his career in the area of journals, having served as the Editor-in-Chief of the Management Information Systems Quarterly (MISQ), as Associate Editor of six other journals and having conceived of, founded and obtained a publisher for the highly-respected journal Information Systems Research (ISR).

In addition to academic activities, King is co-owner of Cleland-King Inc., a consulting firm. He advised corporations and public organizations all over the world. The most interesting recognition King has received was a "King-is-a Liar" demonstration held in Red Square in Moscow. CIA analysts revealed that Vladimir Putin had plagiarized significant portions of one of King's books for his master thesis.

King served as a Senior Staff Member to the US Senate Budget Committee in 1976-1977. Sam Nunn, a United States Senator from Georgia (1976-1997) as a member of the Democratic Party, was the appointer. King is a licensed private pilot and motorcyclist and a certified sailboat captain and SCUBA diver. He jokes that he is also a CPA - Certified Pesticide Applicator - a certification that he found useful to obtain when he bought a farm with an orchard.

Selected publications

Selected books 
 Organizational Transformation through Business Process Reengineering: Applying Lessons Learned (1998) 
 Marketing Management Information Systems (1977) 
 Systems Analysis and Project Management (1983) 
 Marketing Scientific and Technical Information (2020) 
 Knowledge Management and Organizational Learning (2009) 
 Strategic Planning and Policy (1978) 
 Planning for Information Systems (2009) 
 School Days: Coming of Age in the Mid-20th Century (2012) 
 School Days II (2013)

References

1938 births
University of Pittsburgh alumni
University of Pittsburgh faculty
Management scientists
Information systems researchers
Living people
Management Information Systems Quarterly editors